Microdon is a fly genus. 

Microdon may also refer to the scientific names of several different species of fish:

Cyclothone microdon
Haplochromis microdon
Lethrinus microdon
Lethrinops microdon
Pachystomias microdon
Panna microdon, a species of Panna fish
Pristis microdon
Pseudotriakis microdon
Salangichthys microdon